The list of Sierra Leone Creole people is an incomplete list of notable individuals of Creole ethnicity and ancestry.

This list is ordered by category of human endeavour.

Academic figures

Economists
Yvonne Aki-Sawyerr (born 1967), economist and chartered accountant
David Omashola Carew, economist and former minister of finance
Noah Arthur Cox-George (1915–2004), professor of economics and dean at Fourah Bay College
Omotunde E.G. Johnson (born 1941), economist and senior research associate at the IMF

Educational administrators
Hannah Benka-Coker (née: Luke) (1903–1952), educator and founder of Freetown Secondary School for Girls
Henry Rawlingson Carr (1863–1945), administrator and director of education
Bertha Conton (1923– 2022), educator, and founder of Leone Preparatory School
William Farquhar Conton (1925–2003), historian, author and chief education officer
Florence Agnes Dillsworth (1937–2000), former principal of St. Joseph's Convent School and one-time mayor of Freetown
Cassandra Garber, former headmistress at Freetown Secondary School for Girls and current president of the Krio Descendants Union
Sam Franklyn Gibson (born 1951), educator and one-time mayor of Freetown
Lati Hyde-Forster (1911–2001), first African principal of Annie Walsh Memorial School and first female graduate of Fourah Bay College
James Thomas Roberts (1871–1964), educationalist and former principal of Methodist Boys High School

Engineers
Ogunlade Davidson (1949–2022), senior Fulbright fellow, professor of mechanical engineering and dean at Fourah Bay College
Thomas Frederick Hope (1919–1996), first chief engineer, Guma Valley Water Company and first chairman, Ecobank Transnational Incorporated
Trudy Morgan (born 1966), first African woman to be awarded a fellowship of the Institution of Civil Engineers

Historians
Violet Showers Johnson, professor of history and director of Africana studies at Texas A&M University
Florence Peters Mahoney (born 1929), Fulbright professor  of African history and first Gambian woman to be awarded a PhD
Arthur Daniel Porter III (1924–2019), author, professor of history and university administrator
Aaron Belisarius Sibthorpe (c. 1830–1916), nineteenth century historian
Akintola Gustavus Wyse (died 2002), author and professor of history at Fourah Bay College

Humanists and political theorists
Nicholas G.J. Ballanta (born: Nicholas Taylor) (1893–1962), musicologist and Guggenheim Fellow, who pioneered the scientific study of the musical conceptions of  African people
Edward Wilmot Blyden III (1918–2010), political scientist and former dean at Fourah Bay College
Reginald Akindele Cline-Cole, author, associate professor and developmental geographer
Delia Jarrett-Macauley (born 1958), multi-disciplinary scholar in history, literature and cultural politics who is a fellow of the Royal Society of Arts
Victor Okrafo-Smart, author and genealogical researcher
Abiodun Williams  (born 1961), professor of practice and former president of The Hague Institute for Global Justice

Legal scholars
James Ayodele Jenkins-Johnston (1946–2017), barrister and legal scholar in Professional Practice and Ethics at the Sierra Leone Law School
George Gelaga King (1932–2016), former judge and legal scholar at the Sierra Leone Law School who was a Fellow of the Royal Society of Arts
John Bankole Thompson (1936–2021), judge and former professor in the department of Criminal Justice and Police Studies at Eastern Kentucky University

Linguists and literary theorists
Dennis Bright, academic in francophone studies and former director of the Franco-Sierra Leonean Pedagogical Centre
Gladys Casely-Hayford (1904–1950), poet, playwright and first author to write in the Krio language
Thomas Decker (1916–1978), linguist, poet, and Krio language revisionist
Clifford Nelson Fyle (1933–2006), professor of english and co-author of the Krio-English Dictionary
Lemuel A. Johnson (1941–2002), poet, literary critic and professor of english at the University of Michigan
Eldred Durosimi Jones (1925–2020), linguist, literary critic, university professor and principal of Fourah Bay College
Eustace Palmer, literary critic, public orator and professor of english at the University of Texas

Scientists
Trevor Bamidele Davies (born 1972), associate professor of mathematics and fellow of the Royal Astronomical Society
Charles Farrell Easmon (born 1946), professor and clinical director of medical microbiology at St Mary's Hospital Medical School
Enid Ayodele Forde (born 1932), geospatial analyst,  chair of the  geography department at Fourah Bay College and first Sierra Leonean woman to gain a PhD
Monty Patrick Jones (born 1961), agronomist, research professor and former minister of agriculture, forestry and food security
Tanniemola Liverpool (born 1971), author and professor of theoretical physics at University of Bristol
Abioseh Davidson Nicol (1925–1994), physician, biomedical researcher, professor and first Sierra Leonean principal of Fourah Bay College

Theologians
Edward Fasholé-Luke (born 1934) academic and Anglican theologian
Thomas Sylvester Johnson (1873–1955), educator, theologian  and former bishop of Sierra Leone
Lamina Sankoh (born: Etheldred Jones) (1884–1964),  cleric, theologian and philosopher  who taught at various historically black colleges in the United States
Harry Alphonso Sawyerr (1909–1986), writer and Anglican theologian

Actors and actresses

Paul Barber (born 1951), actor best known for his roles in Only Fools and Horses and The Full Monty
Nzinga Christine Blake (born 1981), actress and winner of the Emmy Awards for best executive producer
Chadwick Boseman (1976–2020), actor and winner of the Golden Globe Awards
Jeillo Edwards (1942–2004), actress and graduate of the Guildhall School of Music and Drama
 Idris Elba (born 1972), actor and winner of the BET and Golden Globe Awards
Desmond Finney, actor and nominee for the Zafaa Global Film Awards
Cornelius Macarthy, actor and winner of the London Independent Film Festival Awards
Adetokumboh McCormack (born 1982), actor best known for his roles in the television series Lost and Heroes
Adetunji Delpaneaux Wills, actor

Aviators and military figures

Tom Carew, major-general and former chief of defence staff
Emmanuel Cole (1907–1972), soldier and hero of the "Gunners Revolt"
James Pinson Davies (1828–1906), merchant, former  British Naval officer and later agronomist known as the pioneer of cocoa farming in West Africa
Adesanya Kwamina Hyde (1915–1993), diplomat and former aviator in the Royal Air Force awarded the Distinguished Flying Cross for acts of valour and courage
Andrew Juxon-Smith (1931–1996), former commander of the armed forces and head of state of Sierra Leone
Arthur Nelson-Williams, brigadier-general and former chief of defence staff
Richard Akinwande Savage (1903–1993), medical doctor and first  West African to serve as a British Army officer
John Clavell Smythe (1915–1996), former Royal Air Force aviation officer, barrister and attorney-general of Sierra Leone
Valentine Strasser (born 1967), former army officer and head of state of Sierra Leone
Emanuel Adeniyi Thomas (1914–1945), first black African to qualify as a pilot and first West African commissioned to serve as a Royal Air Force officer

Beauty pageant winners and models

Tyrilla Gouldson (born 1984), beauty pageant contestant who represented Sierra Leone at the Miss World 2008
Enid Jones-Boston (born 1995), model and beauty pageant contestant who represented Sierra Leone at the Miss World 2019
Twilla Ojukutu-Macauley  (born 1967), model and beauty pageant contestant who represented Sierra Leone at the Miss World 1988
Neyorlyn Melrose Williams (born 1991), model and beauty pageant contestant who represented Sierra Leone at the Miss World 2010
Vanessa Williams (born 1990), model and beauty pageant contestant who represented Sierra Leone at the Miss World 2012

Composers

Nicholas G.J. Ballanta (born: Nicholas Taylor) (1893–1962), composer and music scholar
Avril Coleridge-Taylor  (1903–1998), pianist–composer and first female conductor at HMS Royal Marines and the London Symphony Orchestra
Samuel Coleridge-Taylor (1875–1912), composer and conductor best known for his cantata Hiawatha's Wedding Feast
Yulisa Amadu Maddy (born: Pat Maddy) (1936–2014), composer, journalist and writer

Creole-descended families 

Awoonor-Renner family
Campbell family
Conton family
Davis family
Easmon family
Smith family
Snowball family

Diplomats

Edward Wilmot Blyden III (1918–2010), diplomat, political scientist and educator
Collins O. Bright (born 1917), special envoy and diplomat
Adesanya Kwamina Hyde (1915–1993), diplomat and former airman in the Royal Air Force
John Ernst Leigh, diplomat and former presidential candidate for the Sierra Leone People's Party
Desmond Fashole Luke (1935–2021), diplomat, former Chief Justice of the Supreme Court and one-time Minister of Health
Abiodun Williams  (born 1961), academic, diplomat and former president of The Hague Institute for Global Justice

Entrepreneurs and businesspersons

Richard Beale Blaize (1845–1904), Sierra Leonean-Nigerian businessman, newspaper publisher, financier, and black nationalist
James Pinson Davies (1828–1906), merchant, former  British Naval officer and later agronomist known as the pioneer of cocoa farming in West Africa
John Ezzidio (1810–1872), businessman, politician and pre-municipality era mayor of Freetown
Thomas Frederick Hope (1919–1996), first engineer-in-chief, Guma Valley Water Company and first chairman, Ecobank Transnational Incorporated
Maximiliano Jones (1871–1944), farmer and millionaire
Henry Olufemi Macauley (born 1962), businessman with expertise in the oil industries and former Minister of Energy
Samuel Herbert Pearse, wealthy Nigerian businessman and legislator of Sierra Leone Creole decent
John 'Johnny' Taylor (died 1898), Sierra Leone Creole merchant during 1898 Hut Tax War
John Malamah Thomas (1844–1922), entrepreneur and mayor of Freetown from 1904 to 1912
Samuel Benjamin Thomas (1833– 1901), philanthropist, entrepreneur and one of the richest men in 19th-century Africa.
William Vivour (1830–1890), single most successful 19th-century planter in Africa
Frederica Williams (born 1958), president and chief executive officer at Whittier Street Health Center

Human-rights activists

Herbert Christian Bankole-Bright (1883–1958), political activist, medical doctor and founder of the National Council of Sierra Leone
James Desmond Buckle (1910–1964), trade unionist and political activist
Adelaide Casely-Hayford (1868–1960), activist of cultural nationalism, writer, feminist and pioneer of women's education in Sierra Leone
FannyAnn Eddy (1974–2004), activist for LGBT rights
Edna Elliott-Horton (1904–1994), political activist and first West African woman to complete a BA degree  in the Liberal Arts
Herbert Olayinka Macauley (1864–1946), political activist and founder of Nigerian nationalism
Lamina Sankoh (born: Etheldred Jones) (1884–1964), political activist, educator, banker and cleric who founded the "Peoples Party" which eventually became the Sierra Leone People's Party (SLPP)
Nancy Victoria Steele (1923–2001), labour activist, founder and leader of the National Congress of Sierra Leone Women
Isaac Wallace-Johnson (1894–1965), political activist and trade unionist during the colonial era

Judges and barristers

Nicholas Colin Browne-Marke (born 1957), judge in the Supreme Court of Sierra Leone and The Gambia
Christian Frederick Cole (1852–1885), first black graduate of Oxford and first African barrister to practice in the English courts
Gershon Beresford Collier (1927–1994), former Chief Justice of Sierra Leone, educator and diplomat
Dame Linda Penelope Dobbs (born 1951), first non-white person to be appointed to the senior judiciary of England and Wales
Patrick Omolade Hamilton, Supreme Court judge of Sierra Leone
James Ayodele Jenkins-Johnston (1946–2017), barrister and human rights defender
George Gelaga King (1932–2016), judge presiding at the Special Court for Sierra Leone
Jamesina Leonora King, jurist and first Sierra Leonean Commissioner of the African Commission on Human and Peoples Rights
Augustus Merriman-Labor (1877–1919), barrister, writer and munitions worker
John Clavell Smythe (1915–1996), former Royal Air Force navigation officer, barrister and attorney-general of Sierra Leone
Ade Renner Thomas (born 1945), barrister and one-time Chief Justice of Sierra Leone
Stella Thomas (1906–1974), Nigerian of Sierra Leone Creole descent who was the first West African female to qualify as a lawyer
John Bankole Thompson (1936–2021), jurist, judge and academic
Frances Claudia Wright (1919–2010), first Sierra Leonean woman to be called to the Bar in Great Britain and to practice law in Sierra Leone

Knights and dames

Sir Kitoye Ajasa (born: Edmund Macauley) (1866– 1937), lawyer and legislator during the colonial period and first Nigerian to receive a knighthood
Sir Ernest Beoku-Betts (1895–1957), jurist and one-time mayor of Freetown
Sir Henry Lightfoot Boston (1898–1969), Governor-General of Sierra Leone from 1962 to 1967
Dame Linda Penelope Dobbs (born 1951), first non-white person to be appointed to the senior judiciary of England and Wales
Sir Samuel Lewis (1843–1903), first mayor of Freetown and first West African to receive a knighthood
Sir Emile Fashole Luke (1895–1980), former Chief Justice and Speaker of Parliament

Mayors of Freetown

Yvonne Aki-Sawyerr, (born 1969), finance professional and current mayor of Freetown
Samuel Sigismund Barlatt, prominent lawyer and one-time mayor of Freetown
Sir Ernest Beoku-Betts (1895–1957), jurist and one-time mayor of Freetown
William John Campbell, former mayor of Freetown
Emmanuel Cummings, former mayor of Freetown
Eustace Taylor Cummings (1890–1967), medical doctor and mayor of Freetown from 1948 to 1954
Constance Cummings-John (1918–2000), educator, politician and first female mayor of Freetown
Florence Agnes Dillsworth (1937–2000), one-time mayor of Freetown and former principal of St. Joseph's Convent School
John Ezzidio (1810–1872), businessman, politician and pre-municipality era mayor of Freetown
Sam Franklyn Gibson (born 1951), teacher and one-time mayor of Freetown
Herbert George-Williams, former mayor of Freetown
June Holst-Roness (1929–2008), medical doctor and former mayor of Freetown
Winstanley Bankole Johnson, one-time mayor of Freetown
Sir Samuel Lewis (1843–1903), first mayor of Freetown and first West African to receive a knighthood
John Malamah Thomas (1844–1922), entrepreneur and mayor of Freetown from 1904 to 1912
Thomas Josiah Thompson (1867–1941), lawyer, one-time mayor of Freetown and founder of the Sierra Leone Daily Mail

Musicians

Patrice Bart-Williams (born 1979), singer-songwriter, music producer and film-maker
Ebenezer Calendar (1912–1985), musician who created and popularized Creole gumbe music and maringa music
Asadata Dafora (1890–1965), multidisciplinary musician
Evelyn Mary Dove (1902–1987), singer and actress
Devonté Hynes (born 1985), singer, songwriter and record producer
Bunny Mack (1945–2015), singer, songwriter and performer
N'fa (born 1979), hip hop recording artist
Dr. Oloh (1944–2007), afropop and jazz musician
Daddy Saj (born 1978), rapper who blends hip hop  and traditional Creole gumbe music

Physicians and surgeons

John Augustus Abayomi-Cole  (1848–1943), medical doctor and herbalist
Crispin Adeniyi-Jones (1876–1957), psychiatrist and first director of the Yaba Asylum in Nigeria
Herbert Christian Bankole-Bright (1883–1958), political activist, medical doctor and founder of the National Council of Sierra Leone party
Edward Mayfield Boyle (1874–1936), medical practitioner and one of the first West Africans to attend Howard University College of Medicine
Robert Wellesley Cole (1907–1995), general surgeon and first West African to become a Fellow of the Royal College of Surgeons
William Broughton Davies (1831–1906), first West African to qualify as a medical doctor
Charles Odamtten Easmon (1913– 1994), performed the first successful open-heart surgery in West Africa
John Farrell Easmon (1856–1900), medical doctor who coined the term Blackwater fever and wrote the first clinical diagnosis of the disease linking it to malaria
Macormack Farrell Easmon (1890–1972), medical doctor and founder of the Sierra Leone National Museum
George Bernard Frazer (1933–2018), medical practitioner and gynaecologist
George Adeniji Garrick (1917–1988), medical doctor and high jump record holder
June Holst-Roness (1929–2008), medical doctor and former mayor of Freetown
James Africanus Horton (1835–1883), surgeon, scientist and political thinker who worked towards African independence a century before it occurred
Irene Ighodaro (née: Wellesley-Cole) (1916–1995), first Sierra Leonean woman to qualify as a medical doctor
Ulric Emmanuel Jones (1940–2020), first Sierra Leonean neurosurgeon
Nathaniel Thomas King (1847–1884), one of the earliest western-trained West African doctors to practise medicine in Nigeria
Olayinka Koso-Thomas (born 1937), medical doctor known internationally for her efforts to abolish female genital mutilation
Abioseh Davidson Nicol (1925–1994), physician and biomedical researcher who discovered the breakdown of insulin in the human body, a breakthrough for the treatment of diabetes.
Lenrie Wilfred Peters (1932–2009), surgeon, poet and educator
Arthur Thomas Porter IV (1956 – 2015),  physician and hospital administrator.
William Robert Priddy (1926–2003), medical practitioner and Fellow of the Royal College of Obstetricians and Gynaecologists
William Renner (1846–1917), oncologist and Assistant Surgeon-General during the colonial era
Agnes Yewande Savage (1906–1964), Nigerian of Sierra Leone Creole descent who was the first West African woman to qualify as a medical doctor
Richard Akinwande Savage (1903–1993), medical doctor and first  West African to serve as a British Army officer
Arthur Farquhar Stuart (1927–2002), consultant physician at Connaught Hospital

Pioneer ancestors

Daniel Coker (1780–1847), emigrated from Baltimore, Maryland and was missionary and founder of the West African Methodist Church
David George (c. 1742–1810), emigrated from Nova Scotia and was preacher of the first recorded Baptist service in Africa held under the Cotton Tree before the land was baptized and christened "Free Town"
William Gwinn (born 1755), one of the first black Americans to participate in the antebellum American Back-to-Africa movement to Sierra Leone
Abraham Hazeley (1784–1847), Nova Scotian settler and founder of what was to become one of the most prominent Creole families in Freetown.
Montague James (died 1812), leader of Cudjoe's Town (Trelawny Town) maroons who settled in Freetown where he helped put down the Black Nova Scotian revolt
Major Jarrett (died 1839), leader of the Jamaican Maroons who helped put down the Black Nova Scotian revolt
Boston King (c. 1760–1802), soldier and Black Loyalist who helped found Freetown and became the first Methodist missionary to African indigenous people
Cato Perkins (died 1805), former African American slave, later missionary, who migrated to Freetown, where he led a strike of carpenters against the Sierra Leone Company
Mary Perth  (1740–1813), prominent African American colonist and businesswoman in Freetown
Thomas Peters (1738–1793), soldier with the auxiliary troops of the British Black Company of Pioneers and the revolutionary founding father of Freetown
Elizabeth Renner (died 1826), emigrated from Nova Scotia and became the first female teacher and principal of a girls' school in the missionary in Africa
Charles Samuels (died early 1800s), maroon officer from Cudjoe's Town (Trelawny Town), who was assistant to Colonel Montague James
Harry Washington (c. 1740–1800), soldier and Black Loyalist in the American Revolutionary War who was among several hundred settlers who rose up in a brief rebellion against British rule in Freetown
Moses 'Daddy' Wilkinson (born 1746), was a Wesleyan Methodist preacher who migrated to Sierra Leone in 1791 where he established the first Methodist church in Settler Town and survived the rebellion in 1800.

Politicians and civil administrators

Arnold Bishop-Gooding (born 1950), lawyer and former Attorney-General of Sierra Leone
Chidi Blyden, American foreign policy advisor who serves as Deputy Assistant Secretary of Defense for African Affairs in the Biden administration.
Sylvia Olayinka Blyden (born 1971), journalist, political commentator, newspaper editor and one-time cabinet minister
Sir Henry Lightfoot Boston (1898–1969), Governor-General of Sierra Leone from 1962 to 1967
Dennis Bright, university instructor and former Minister of Sports
David Omashola Carew, economist and former Minister of Finance
Christopher Okoro Cole (1921–1990), one-time Governor-General and Chief Justice of Sierra Leone
Femi Claudius Cole (born 1962), politician of the Unity Party and first Sierra Leonean woman to form a political party
Edmund Cowan (born 1937), former Speaker of Parliament and Ombudsman
Ivor Gustavus Cummings (1913–1992), first black official in the British Colonial Office
Stanley David Garrick (1888–1958), senior administrator and courtier
Prince Alex Harding, former Minister of Transportation and Communication
Victor Chukuma Johnson (1944–2012), former chairman and deputy leader of the All People's Congress
Andrew Juxon-Smith (1931–1996), former commander of the Armed Forces and Head of State of Sierra Leone
Charles Burgess King (1875–1961), former President of Liberia and of Sierra Leone Creole heritage
Desmond Fashole Luke (1935–2021), diplomat, former Chief Justice of the Supreme Court and one-time Minister of Health
George William Nicol (1810–1884), first African Colonial Secretary of Sierra Leone
Sir Emile Fashole Luke (1895–1980), former Chief Justice and Speaker of Parliament
Murietta Olu-Williams (born 1923), first woman in Africa to achieve the rank of Permanent Secretary in the Civil Service
James Ernest Parkes (1861–1899), first  Secretary for Native Affairs during the colonial era in Sierra Leone
Solomon James Pratt (1921–2017), former Attorney General and Minister of Justice
George Theophilus Robinson (1922–2006), civil administrator and founder of the Krio Descendants Union
Valentine Strasser (born 1967), former army officer and Head of State of Sierra Leone
Abel Bankole Stronge, lawyer and one-time Speaker of the Parliament of Sierra Leone
Nanette Beatrice Thomas (born 1956), former Minister of Political and Public Affairs
Christiana Thorpe (born 1949), former two-term Chief Electoral Commissioner and Chairperson of the National Electoral Commission

Religious leaders

William Barleycorn (1848–1925), first Primitive Methodist missionary who went to Fernando Po (now known as Bioko) in Africa in the early 1880s.
Samuel Ajayi Crowther (c. 1809–1891), Sierra Leonean-Nigerian clergyman and first Anglican Bishop of West Africa
Samuel Johnson (1846–1901), historian and Anglican priest
Thomas Sylvester Johnson (1873–1955), educator, theologian  and former bishop of Sierra Leone'
George Gurney Nicol (1856–1888), clergyman and first African graduate of Cambridge University
Moses Nathanael Scott (1911–1988), clergyman and Anglican Bishop of Sierra Leone who later became Archbishop of the Province of West Africa
Kathleen Easmon Simango (née: Easmon) (1891–1924), missionary, artist and first West African to earn a diploma from the Royal College of Arts

Sports figures

Footballers (association, soccer)
 Samuel Barlay (born 1986), midfielder with IFK Mora who has made numerous appearances for Sierra Leone's national football team - Leone Stars
Moses Barnett (born 1990), defender in the English Football League and England under 17s
Chris Bart-Williams (born 1974), former England under 21s and Premier League midfielder
Albert Cole (born 1981), former midfielder for Mighty Blackpool FC and Leone Stars
Carlton Cole (born 1983), former striker in the Premier League with several appearances for England
Curtis Eugene Davies (born 1985), defender in the English Football League Championship and England under 21s
Ryan Giggs (born 1973), former wide midfielder for Manchester United with several appearances for Wales
Albert Jarrett (born 1984), former winger in the English Football League Championship with several appearances for Leone Stars
Obi Metzger (born 1987), attacking midfielder for Finnish second division side FC Haka who has made several appearances for Leone Stars
Nigel Reo-Coker (born 1984), former midfielder in the Premier League and England under 21s
Leroy Rosenior (born 1964), former striker for England under 21s and Leone Stars
Liam Rosenior (born 1984), former full-back and winger in the English Football League Championship and England under 21s
Rodney Strasser (born 1990), defensive midfielder with Turun Palloseura FC based in Turku, Finland
William Sorba Thomas (born 1999), winger for Huddersfield Town FC and the Wales national team
Augustine Williams (born 1997), striker who plays in the USL Championship and has made a few appearances for Leone Stars
Kevin Adrian Wright (born 1995). defender who plays for IK Sirius in Allsvenskan with a few appearances for Leone Stars

Track and field athletes
William Akabi-Davis (born 1962), sprinter at the 1980 Summer Olympics
Julia Helene Armstrong (born 1959), marathon runner
Eunice Barber (born 1974), former athlete competing in heptathlon and long jump
Horace Dove-Edwin (born 1967), retired sprinter who specialized in the 100-metre dash
Walter During (born 1960),  sprinter at the 1980 Summer Olympics
George Adeniji Garrick (1917–1988), medical doctor and high jump record holder
Rudolph George (born 1957), sprinter at the 1980 Summer Olympics
Denton Guy-Williams (born 1972), sprinter at the 1992 Summer Olympics
Modupe Jonah (born 1966), middle-distance runner at the 1988 Summer Olympics
Pierre Lisk (born 1971), sprinter at the 1996 Summer Olympics
 Eugenia Osho-Williams (born 1964), former sprinter and first woman to represent Sierra Leone at the Olympics
David Sawyerr (born 1961), sprinter at the 1984 Summer Olympics
Josephus Thomas (born 1971), sprinter at the 1996 Summer Olympics
Rachel Thompson (born 1964),  middle-distance runner at the 1988 Summer Olympics

Boxers
John Coker (born 1940), competed in the men's heavyweight event at the 1968 Summer Olympics.
Israel Cole (born 1964), boxer at the 1984 Summer Olympics
Francis "Frank" Dove (1897–1957), boxer at the 1920 Summer Olympics
Egerton Forster (born 1959), boxer at the 1984 Summer Olympics
Leonard Benker Johnson (1902–1974), middleweight boxing champion
 Desmond Williams (born 1967),  competed in the men's light middleweight event at the 1988 Summer Olympics

Rugby players

Danny Wilson (born 1955), former rugby union, and professional rugby league player
Billy Boston (born 1934), former professional rugby league footballer

Swimmers
Michael 'Joko' Collier (born 1971), swimmer at the 1996 Summer Olympics
Joshua Wyse (born 2001), swimmer at the 2020 Summer Olympics

Other sports
Napheesa Collier (born 1996), professional basketball player and gold medallist at the 2020 Summer Olympic Games
Frederick Harris (born 1984), judoka at the 2020 Summer Olympics
Frank Williams (born 1964), cyclist at the 1996 Summer Olympics
George Wyndham (born 1990), para table tennis player who competed at the 2016 Summer Paralympics

Visual artists

Gaston Bart-Williams (1938–1990), journalist and film maker
Alphonso Lisk-Carew (1887–1969), prominent photographer appointed for the visit of the Duke of Connaught
Kathleen Easmon Simango (née: Easmon) (1891–1924), painter, fashion designer and graduate of the Royal College of Arts
Alfred Ashley Taylor, ball point artist known for creating hyper- realistic drawings

Writers and journalists

Bankole Awoonor-Renner (1898–1970), first Black African to study in the Soviet Union, and first African to be accredited to the Institute of Journalists in London.
Gaston Bart-Williams (1938–1990), journalist, novelist and film director
Gladys Casely-Hayford (1904–1950), first author to write in the Krio language
Raymond Ayodele Charley (1948–1993), playwright and writer
Syl Cheney-Coker (born 1945), poet, novelist, and journalist
James Vivian Clinton (1902–1973), expatriate and journalist
Thomas Decker (1916–1978), writer, poet, journalist, and linguist
Clifford Nelson Fyle (1933–2006), scholar and author known for writing the lyrics to the Sierra Leone National Anthem
Delia Jarrett-Macauley (born 1958), writer, academic and broadcaster
Eyamide Ella Lewis-Coker (née: Smith), writer and book author
Valerie Mason-John (born 1962), author and public speaker
Augustus Merriman-Labor (1877–1919), writer best known for his 1909 book Britons Through Negro Spectacles
Nii Ayikwei Parkes (born 1974), poet, writer and sociocultural commentator
Emmanuel Bankole Timothy (1923–1994), journalist and biographer

See also

List of African Americans
List of Americo-Liberian people
List of Black Britons
List of Black Nova Scotians
List of Gambian Creole people
List of Jamaican Maroons
List of Krio Fernandino people
List of Saro people (Nigerian Creoles)

References

Creole peoples
Sierra Leone Creole people
People of Black Nova Scotian descent
People of Jamaican Maroon descent
People of Liberated African descent
Sierra Leone Creole people